The Kakaramea-Tihia Massif is an andesitic volcano in the central North Island of New Zealand. The term Kakaramea means many colours in Maori and relates to rock/soil colour on parts of the massif so is a common place name in New Zealand. The massif is located in the North Island Volcanic Plateau, to the south of Lake Taupo. Lake Rotoaira lies to the south-east as does further away Mount Tongariro and to the east is Pihanga on the other side of the Te Ponanga Saddle from Tihia.

Geology
Eruptions from the Kakaramea-Tihia Massif last occurred more than 20,000 years ago and the most recent appears to be from a vent west-south-west of Tihia. The older formations were from vents aligned north-west to south-east but the more recent eruptions are consistent with the north-north-east to south-south-west alignment of the present southern Taupo Volcanic Zone rifting. It is adjacent to the Waihi Fault Zone which lies almost directly under Kakaramea.

Biology
It is one of the habitats where Dactylanthus taylorii a very rare endangered fully parasitic flowering plant is found. This is pollinated by the endangered New Zealand lesser short-tailed bat.

The Keepers of the Wai
In Maori custom, the area became the responsibility of the Matapuna people (a mix of Tuwharetoa, Tama Kopiri/Upper Whanganui whanau/Tu Hope - Descendants of Te Rere Ao, the First of Tuwharetoa) of the Tuwharetoa people, who have traditionally been the keepers of the wai (Keepers of the Water) and Maunga Kaitiaki (Protectors of the Mountain).

See also
 List of volcanoes in New Zealand

References

External links
 United Nations Environment Programme: Parks and Protected Areas: World Heritage Sites: Tongariro National Park
 Best, Elsdon. The Maori - Volume I, V Myth and Folk Lore. p205.
 Mt Tihia Tramp

Volcanoes of Waikato
Tongariro Volcanic Centre
Ruapehu District
Volcanism of New Zealand
Taupō Volcanic Zone